Pseudozelurus is a genus of assassin bugs in the  family Reduviidae. There are at least two described species in Pseudozelurus.

Species
These two species belong to the genus Pseudozelurus:
 Pseudozelurus arizonicus (Banks, 1910)
 Pseudozelurus superbus (Champion, 1899)

References

Further reading

 
 

Reduviidae
Articles created by Qbugbot